The 2020–21 season was the 116th season of competitive football in Turkey.

Pre-season

League tables

Süper Lig

1.Lig

Turkish Cup

Final

National team

Friendlies

2020–21 UEFA Nations League

2022 FIFA World Cup qualification

UEFA Euro 2020

Turkish clubs in Europe

UEFA Champions League

Second qualifying round

Group stage

Group H

UEFA Europa League

Second qualifying round

Third qualifying round

Play-off round

Group stage

Group I

References

 
Seasons in Turkish football
Turkish 2020